Sky Cable (stylized as SKYcable) is a cable television service of Sky Cable Corporation in the Philippines. It covers areas across the country with both digital and analog cable services, and it has 700,000 subscribers, controlling 45% of the cable TV market.

History 

Since it started community antenna television system operation in the Philippines on January 26, 1992, SkyCable provides cable Internet, VoIP services and digital cable TV service.

On June 6, 1990, SkyCable Corporation was incorporated via 79.3% stake in Sky Vision Corporation, operator of cable brands, SkyCable and Sun Cable.

On April 18, 1991, Sky Vision Corporation was incorporated and ventures into cable television (SkyCable and Sun Cable), communication, system, television media, shopping network (Sky Mall) and film distribution (Sky Jemah). It is owned 18.8% by ABS-CBN Corporation and 78% by Lopez Inc.

On March 30, 1995, Central CATV Inc. was granted a 28-year provisional franchise to establish, construct, maintain and operated community antenna television system in the Philippines through Republic Act 7969.

In 1997, Sky Vision Corporation acquired 47% of Pilipino Cable Corp., operator of Sun Cable for P900 million.

In 2001, Benpres Holdings Inc. and Philippine Long Distance Telephone Company signed a master consolidation agreement for SkyCable Corporation to consolidate its interest.

In July 2001, Unilink Communications Corp. operator of Home Cable, Philippines second largest cable TV company, merged its CATV operation to SkyCable and created Beyond Cable Inc. with an enterprise value of P14.5 billion. Beyond Cable Inc. controls 66.5% through Benpress Holdings Corp. and 33.5% through MediaQuest Holdings, Inc.

On December 7, 2001, Beyond Cable Holdings Inc. was incorporated.

In May 2011, Singaporean firm Sampaquita Communications Pte. Ltd. acquired 40 percent of SkyCable through Philippine Depositary Receipts worth P3.612 billion and P250 million of convertible notes to fund the expansion of SkyCable's broadband Internet and cable TV services.

On May 11, 2012, SkyCable bought Destiny Cable Inc., Uni-Cable TV Inc. and Solid Broadband Corporation's cable TV and broadband internet assets and subscribers with consolidating value of P3.497 billion.

Basic cable packages 

Skycable allows its subscribers to select their own packages or channels, comparable to a pay per channel service most generally used in the United States. SkyCable also introduces the package-pricing model typically used by other cable television providers in which channels are classified into packages.

Postpaid 

The SkyCable postpaid bundles are categorized into 10 clusters named as Select, Bronze 299, Bronze 399, Bronze 499, Silver HD, Gold HD, Postpaid HD (299, 549, 999, 1999) and a separate payment scheme for its Premium/Pay-Per-View.

Prepaid 

SkyCable also offered prepaid packages to its cable TV service, the Silver Prepaid and Select Plus Prepaid. It was a prepaid cable TV service based on a non-recurring subscription scheme and allows non-postpaid customers to subscribe to selected channels and pay only for the desire duration of viewing and the service requires a digital addressable set-top box. The prepaid plans came in an array of card denomination to choose from that is suitable to its non-postpaid subscribers. Silver Prepaid and Select Plus Prepaid packages came in similar denomination: 3, 15 and 30 days. But as of around 2011 or 2012, it currently no longer offered for new subscribers and status of remaining subscribers remained uncertain. But recently, as of around 2015, the Prepaid service were relaunched and introduced Prepaid 99 and Prepaid 250, and each prepaid package/s valid within 30 days. It was offered initially available for Greater Manila Area and provinces nearby (Cavite and Laguna). It was later expanded its service for regional system areas, first it was expanded for new subscribers in Cebu and Davao, then the rest of Visayan cities (Bacolod, Iloilo and Dumaguete) and lastly expanded in General Santos. In the 4th quarter of 2016, prepaid plans had been phased out. However, it is still available for loading amounts.

Digital system 

In an ongoing exertion to battle cable piracy and averting illegitimate connections, SkyCable through SkyCable Digital adopts digital video broadcasting for cable or DVB-C. It is a standard for transmitting digital television signal over cable. SkyCable uses digital video compression or distribution through its digital addressable box or the Digibox, a digital set-top box that uses the DVB-C broadcast standard to give its subscribers access to its digital infrastructure.

Smart card 

SkyCable Digital's Digibox conveys programming with encryption to alleviate signal piracy. It utilizes ISO/IEC 7816 smart cards, which transmit digital signals to the receiver to decrypt the programming for viewing. To fully consummate the Digibox, it uses Irdeto Access B.V. smart cards, which are ISO/IEC 7816 compliant. It is given to all subscribers with standard and high definition set-top boxes. The smart card stores the subscriber's information and the plan to which they subscribe.

High-definition channels 

On September 19, 2008, SkyCable initiated the pay-per-view broadcast of the 2008 Ryder Cup golf tournament in high-definition (HD). It is transmitted in 1080i resolution and paves the way for the Philippines to convey the first HD signal. In July 2009, Skycable also commenced a locally produced HD program through, Balls HD, the collegiate basketball tournament—University Athletic Association of the Philippines and the National Collegiate Athletic Association. At present, SkyCable offers over 20 HD channels accessible through separate payment. Lineup consists of RTM HD, ABS-CBN HD, ABS-CBN Sports + Action HD, ANC HD, CNN HD, Discovery Asia, Discovery HD, History HD, Kapamilya Channel HD, National Geographic HD, HBO HD, NBA Premium TV HD, Fox Movies HD, Fox Crime HD, FOX Life HD, Comedy Central HD, HBO Hits HD, Fox HD, MTV Live HD, Fox Family Movies HD, ASN HD, Cartoon Network HD, Nickelodeon HD, Outdoor Channel HD, Fashion TV HD, Freeview Channel HD, AXN HD, Disney Channel HD, Fox Sports HD, Fox Sports 2 HD and Fox Sports 3 HD.

Personal video recording 

On December 8, 2010, SkyCable announced that it would launch a new service similar to U. S.-based TiVo for its high and standard definition services within the first quarter of 2011. Initially, the service will be called PVR or personal video recording, which has a 500GB internal hard drive enough to record 135 hours of cable programs in high definition or 217 hours for its standard definition service. Distinct from regular digital video recorders, the PVR uses the built-in electronic program guide that enables its subscribers which programs to be recorded. The new service will also feature Timeshift, a new way of recording programs to be viewed to at a time more opportune to its subscribers, and that would also allow recording of favorite programs on a time delay basis. Timeshift will also allow its subscribers or has the ability to pause live broadcast and in slow motion. On March 21, 2011, SkyCable launches its first personal video recording in the Philippines, the iRecord. It is an enhanced version of its digibox. It allows subscribers to record cable programs up to 145 hours in standard definition or 86 hours in high definition platform. It comes with a 320GB disk space.

Carriage and content disputes

GMA Network signal tampering/distortion 

In February 2003, GMA Network filed a complaint against SkyCable for allegedly moving its signal from channel 12 without approval of the National Telecommunications Commission.  Authorities decided on April 25, 2003, that SkyCable violated the provisions of Memorandum Circular 4-08-88 and ordered to carry the free-to-air television signal on its system except when theoretically impracticable. It also ordered SkyCable to faithfully and strictly conforms with the requirements and to conclude from randomly changing channel assignments without notice and approval from local authorities. As a result, SkyCable filed a motion for reconsideration addressing the rule invalidate the means as it conflicts with a state law on intellectual property but local authorities denied the motion and directed SkyCable to comply with its previous decision. Consequently, the latter filed another appeal through an appellate court but still rejected their request and ordered them to conform to local authorities resolution.

In August 2015, SkyCable Corporation answered GMA Network's complaint over the loss of television signal during the KalyeSerye segment of Eat Bulaga. Citing tweets from outraged fans of the AlDub love team featured in the said segment of the noon-time show, GMA filed a complaint before the National Telecommunications Commission (NTC) through a letter dated Aug. 25. The network said subscribers "are being short-changed through irresponsible acts of their service provider" and appealed for the NTC to take immediate action about the "apparent sabotage" perceived by the viewers. In its statement, SkyCable denied the accusations assuring their customers of their commitment to provide the best service and resolve any glitches.
“The complaint of GMA 7 with the National Telecommunications Commission (NTC) last August 25, 2015, regarding shortchanging of our SkyCable subscribers via irresponsible acts, is a malicious accusation and is without basis," the Lopez-owned firm said. "If there were service interruptions that inconvenienced some of our subscribers, these were isolated and would have affected other channels, not only GMA 7." The cable provider also expressed their willingness to cooperate with investigations that the NTC may pursue regarding the incident.

Carriage disputes with Solar Entertainment 

On January 1, 2008, Solar Entertainment Corporation pulled its 6 cable channels from Sky Cable; namely Basketball TV, Solar Sports, ETC Entertainment Central, 2nd Avenue, Jack TV and Crime/Suspense. The channels were replaced by 6 new channels owned by fellow subsidiary Creative Programs, Inc.; AXN Beyond, Balls, Fox Crime, KidsCo, Maxxx and Velvet. While vice president Juno Chuidian stated in a report to GMA News TV (now GTV, then QTV 11) that the new channels were added because they would offer less "redundant" programming and feature more series that had never been aired in the country before, reports surfaced that the channels were pulled due to a dispute; ABS-CBN believed that Solar's lower fees for advertising on its channels were causing ABS-CBN to lose revenue.

Solar Entertainment however, retaliated by expanding its partnership with the terrestrial broadcaster Radio Philippines Network; adding programming from its C/S cable channel to its primetime lineup, and using the channel as part of its successful bid against ABS-CBN for the next PBA broadcast contract.

AksyonTV 
On March 14, 2011 TV5 filed a complaint to the National Telecommunications Commission against Sky Cable, accusing it of refusing to carry AksyonTV, despite law designating all free-to-air television networks as must-carry channels. The channel was added to Sky Cable's digital lineup on April 30, 2011.

See also
Sky Direct
Sky Cable Corporation
Cignal
ABS-CBN TV Plus
ABS-CBN Corporation

References

External links 
 Official Website

Philippine companies established in 1992
Cable television companies of the Philippines
Companies based in Quezon City
Telecommunications companies established in 1992
Internet service providers of the Philippines
Telecommunications in the Philippines
Sky (cable company)
Assets owned by ABS-CBN Corporation